Ken, Kenneth or Kenny Hill may refer to:
 Kenneth Hill (academic) (1911–1973), British pathologist and academic
 Ken Hill (playwright) (1937–1995), British playwright and theatre director
 Kenneth O. Hill (born 1939), Canadian physicist 
 Ken Hill (botanist) (Kenneth D. Hill, 1948–2010), Australian botanist
 Kenny Hill (English footballer) (born 1953), English football player
 Kenny Hill (defensive back) (born 1958), American football defensive back
 Ken Hill (baseball) (born 1965), American baseball pitcher
 Kenny Hill (rugby league), rugby league footballer of the 1980s and 1990s
 Kenny Hill (quarterback) (Kenneth Wade Hill, Jr., born 1994), American football quarterback
 Ken Hill (motorcyclist) (born 1964), American motorcyclist 
 Ken Hill (Australian footballer) (born 1950), Australian rules footballer

See also 
 Beck Row, Holywell Row and Kenny Hill, a civil parish in Suffolk, England
 Kenny Hill, former name of Bukit Tunku, a neighbourhood in Kuala Lumpur, Malaysia
 Hill (surname)